Bath Township is a township in Freeborn County, Minnesota, United States. The population was 479 at the 2000 census.

History
Bath Township was organized in 1858, and named after Bath, New York, the former home of an early settler.

Geography

Demographics
As of the census of 2000, there were 479 people, 180 households, and 136 families residing in the township. The population density was 13.4 people per square mile (5.2/km2). There were 186 housing units at an average density of 5.2/sq mi (2.0/km2). The racial makeup of the township was 97.91% White, 0.63% African American, 0.21% Native American, 0.21% Asian, 0.21% from other races, and 0.84% from two or more races. Hispanic or Latino of any race were 2.09% of the population.

There were 180 households, out of which 37.8% had children under the age of 18 living with them, 67.8% were married couples living together, 3.3% had a female householder with no husband present, and 23.9% were non-families. 21.1% of all households were made up of individuals, and 9.4% had someone living alone who was 65 years of age or older. The average household size was 2.66 and the average family size was 3.09.

In the township the population was spread out, with 29.2% under the age of 18, 5.4% from 18 to 24, 25.9% from 25 to 44, 26.9% from 45 to 64, and 12.5% who were 65 years of age or older. The median age was 40 years. For every 100 females, there were 111.9 males. For every 100 females age 18 and over, there were 115.9 males.

The median income for a household in the township was $34,773, and the median income for a family was $42,778. Males had a median income of $30,000 versus $24,038 for females. The per capita income for the township was $16,835.  About 2.2% of families and 3.5% of the population were below the poverty line, including 2.3% of those under age 18 and none of those age 65 or over.

References

External links
St. Aidens Cemetery in Bath

Townships in Freeborn County, Minnesota
Townships in Minnesota